The Senzoku Dam is a gravity dam on the Togagawa River (a tributary of the Shō River) about  south of Shogawa in Toyama Prefecture, Japan. It was completed in 1974. The dam sends water to the 32.7 MW Togagawa II hydroelectric power station  to the west on the Shō River. It was commissioned in 1973.

See also

Toga Dam – downstream
Togagawa Dam – upstream

References

Dams in Toyama Prefecture
Gravity dams
Dams completed in 1974
Dams on the Shō River
Hydroelectric power stations in Japan